Kis Ki Aayegi Baraat or Baraat Series is a Pakistani comedy television series developed by Marina Khan and Nadeem Baig for Geo Entertainment. It is loosely based on the marriage ceremonies that take place in Punjabi families in Punjab, and stars Bushra Ansari as a comical woman named Saima Chaudhry along with Saba Hameed, Jawed Sheikh, and Shehryar Zaidi. The series received generally positive reviews from critics.

The comedy series started with its first serial Azar Ki Ayegi Baraat which premiered on 30 November 2009. It was followed by Dolly Ki Ayegi Baraat in 2010, Takkay Ki Ayegi Baraat in 2011, and Annie Ki Ayegi Baraat in 2012. After that, the series was stopped.

The series was also telecast on the Indian channel Zindagi starting in 2015.

Cast and characters
Despite the addition of some new characters in every new season, some of the actors along with characters appeared in all seasons of the series, which include:
 Bushra Ansari as Saima Chaudhry
 Jawed Sheikh as Faraz Ahmed
 Saba Hameed as Rabia Ahmed
 Samina Ahmad as Mehrunnisa
 Shehryar Zaidi as Chaudhry Nazeer Ahmed
 Natasha Ali as Dolly
 Uroosa Siddiqui as Sukaina (Sukhi)
 Raheel Butt as Nabeel
 Sana Askari as Laila Chaudhry
 Asad Siddiqui as Vicky Chaudhry

Azar Ki Ayegi Baraat 
 Hassan Niazi as Azar
 Sarwat Gilani as Sila Chaudhry

Dolly Ki Ayegi Baraat 
 Ayesha Omar as Sila Chaudhry
 Ali Safina as Mustaq (Takkay)

Takkay Ki Ayegi Baraat 
 Alishba Yousuf as Sila Chaudhry
 Ali Safina as Mustaq (Takkay)
 Ahsan Khan as Azar

Annie Ki Ayegi Baraat 
 Naveen Waqar as Annie
 Shahzad Sheikh as Mikaal
 Alishba Yousuf as Sila Chaudhry
 Ali Safina as Mushtaq (Takkay)
 Ahsan Khan as Azar
 Hina Dilpazeer as Billo Farry Dharalla
 Vasay Chaudhry as Bobby D

Development and production
After the success of Azar Ki Ayegi Baraat, Evernew Productions produced its sequel Dolly Ki Ayegi Baraat. This time Vasay Chaudhry was the co-writer with Bushra Ansari. It was the first time that Vasay had written a script for any series. The character of Sila was replaced by Ayesha Omar in this series.

In August 2018, news came out that Bushra Ansari had offered to write the script of the next season of the series. 

Mrs. Chaudhary ka Tarka, a cooking show inspired by Baraat Series, was released in Ramadan 2021.

Spinoff

Mrs. Chaudhary Ka Tarka
In Ramadan 2021, the channel launched a cooking show featuring the character of Saima Chaudhry as a host, inviting the characters from the series as guests in each episode. The show was produced by Humayun Saeed, Hassaan Azhar, and Shehzad Nasib and was directed by Nadeem Baig. The executive producers of the show are Nadeem Baig and Irfan  Malik. It was aired in the afternoon having 20-minute episodes.

References

2008 Pakistani television series debuts
2012 Pakistani television series endings
Urdu-language television shows
Pakistani comedy television series
Punjabi-language television shows